Diadegma crassum is a wasp first described by Bridgman 1889.
No subspecies are listed.

References 

crassum
Insects described in 1889